The Grand River Event Center is a convention center located in Dubuque, Iowa.  It is on the riverfront of the Mississippi River, and is part of the America's River Campus at the Port of Dubuque.  The center is located at 500 Bell Street.

Designed by Populous, the center has about 86,000 square feet (8,000 m²) of space for meetings, conferences, and other social functions. It is designed to accommodate groups ranging in size from 10 to 3,000. There are 12 flexible spaces that can be used for meetings and other functions. The most striking feature of the building is the "River Room," a special glass-walled room that overlooks the Mississippi river.  The building is connected by a skywalk to the Grand Harbor Resort & Waterpark, which is adjacent to the events center.  The center offers a number of services - such as high speed internet, catering, and underground parking.

During the 2004 Presidential campaign, President George W. Bush appeared in two campaign events that were held at the center.

See also
Dubuque, Iowa
Port of Dubuque
Grand Harbor Resort and Waterpark

External links
 Grand River Center Website
 Grand River Center and the America's River Project

Buildings and structures in Dubuque, Iowa
Economy of Dubuque, Iowa
Convention centers in Iowa
Tourist attractions in Dubuque, Iowa
Populous (company) buildings